Nipomo High School is an American public high school located in Nipomo, California. It serves grades 9-12 as part of the Lucia Mar Unified School District.

History

Nipomo High School opened in 2002. Initially, students in Nipomo attended Arroyo Grande High School, however, due to overcrowding, the school was built. It is also home to Central Coast New Tech High, the only technical school in Central California from Thousand Oaks to San Jose.

Sports 
The Titans compete as members of the Central Coast Athletic Association.

CIF Championships 

 Football: 2014 (Southern Section, Northwest Division)
 Boys Swimming: 2018 (Southern Section, Division 3)

Notable alumni
Jeff McNeil, pro baseball player/All-Star for the New York Mets
 Akeem King, pro football player for the Seattle Seahawks/Atlanta Falcons; played in Super Bowl LI

Demographics
2005-2006
 1,277 students;  M/F (50.7/49.3)

 66 certified staff; 

During the 2008–2009 school year, Nipomo High School had an enrollment of 1,215 with an average class size of 26.1 students.

See also
San Luis Obispo County high schools

References

External links 
 

Educational institutions established in 2002
High schools in San Luis Obispo County, California
Public high schools in California
2002 establishments in California